Marc Dann (born March 12, 1962) is an American former politician of the Democratic Party, who served as the Attorney General of Ohio from 2007 until his resignation on May 14, 2008.

Law career and state Senate

Dann earned a B.A. in 1984 from the University of Michigan and a J.D. degree in 1987 from Case Western Reserve University. He practiced law in Youngstown, Ohio, and became active in Democratic Party politics.

Dann ran for the Ohio state Senate in the district then comprising Trumbull and Geauga counties. He finished third in the party primary behind eventual winner Tim Ryan and a local township trustee. From 2001 to 2002, Dann served as a member of the Liberty Local School District board of education.

After Ryan won election to the Ohio State Senate in 2002, Dann convinced the state Senate's Democratic caucus to appoint him to fill the balance of Ryan's term. He easily won election to a full term in 2004. He was reprimanded in 2004 by the Ohio Supreme Court for handling a 2002 alimony case without proper preparation.

Dann was a leading figure in the exposure of a variety of ethics and criminal scandals in the administration of Republican Governor Bob Taft, who became the first sitting governor in Ohio history to plead guilty to a crime. Dann was a leading critic of "Coingate," an investment plan in which $50 million of the state's workers compensation reserve fund was given to Republican Tom Noe, a politically connected coin dealer. When the Coingate scandal broke, Taft, who was a regular golf partner of Noe's, denied having knowledge of the Bureau of Workers Compensation (BWC) decision to invest money in Noe's coin funds. Dann demanded, then sued to see memos, e-mails, and other communications transmitted between Gov. Taft's office and the BWC.

Dann was a vociferous critic of then-Attorney General Jim Petro, a Republican, who had been notified by the Securities and Exchange Commission more than two years earlier that the SEC had serious reservations about investment practices at the BWC. Dann charged that Petro ignored those warnings and the misuse of funds at the agency continued unabated until the Toledo Blade and Dann began to expose the corruption.

Attorney General

Dann announced his candidacy for Attorney General of Ohio on November 14, 2005, saying he would use the office to both help local police and prosecutors deal with street crime and to actively and aggressively pursue white collar criminals.

Dann won 71% of the vote in the Democratic primary against former Cleveland Law Director Subodh Chandra. He won the general election in November 2006 by upsetting Ohio State Auditor Betty Montgomery, a former attorney general. In the general-election campaign, Montgomery tried to distance herself from the scandals of the Taft administration, while criticizing Dann for wanting to use the attorney general's office as a platform for activism.

In a television advertisement, the Montgomery campaign attacked Dann for the above-mentioned 2004 reprimand and for defending a man convicted of showing nude pictures to children. Dann responded to the latter attack by saying he was simply doing his job as an attorney.

Dann received 2.04 million votes to 1.83 million for Montgomery, a margin of 52% to 48%. He ran up huge margins in traditionally Republican areas and also won bellwether counties such as Franklin and Stark. Before her defeat by Dann, Montgomery had never lost a statewide election and had been the top Republican vote-getter in the previous two non-presidential statewide contests. He was sworn in as the 47th Ohio Attorney General on January 8, 2007.

Controversies
Dann had been questioned by some for supporting Capri Cafaro's successful bid to fill Dann's unexpired term in the state Senate. Cafaro, heiress to part of the Cafaro shopping-mall empire, had never won election to office. In addition, Cafaro's father, J. J. Cafaro, had pleaded guilty in 2001 to bribing then-Congressman Jim Traficant to push legislation that would benefit his aviation-equipment company. Capri, then in her early 20s, was president of the aviation company but was not charged with any wrongdoing. In a related trial, Capri testified she had never conspired with Traficant.

As of October 18, 2006, the Cafaro family had contributed $30,500 to Dann's campaign for attorney general, in addition to the $26,000 they had donated to his state Senate campaigns. Of that money, $10,000 came from J. J. Cafaro.
Dann defended his recommendation of Capri Cafaro by saying he believed she was the only qualified candidate to replace him.

Dann faced criticism from the Mansfield News Journal and others for telling (Warren, Ohio) Tribune Chronicle reporter Steve Oravecz to "go ... fuck yourself" at a fundraiser for Democratic presidential candidate Barack Obama. Dann was upset about an article Oravecz had written entitled "Locals with ties to Dann get jobs". The article described how two people with ties to Dann's election campaign, including a woman who he raised as a daughter, were given state jobs. The incident was caught on tape.

According to the Associated Press, the Attorney General's office missed a legal deadline to join an appeal of a Medicaid-related court decision the state government opposes. The deadline for filing the documents was Dann's inauguration day. The failure to join the appeal does not prevent the state from filing briefs in the case.

Scandal and resignation

A sexual harassment scandal arose during Dann's tenure as attorney general, eventually leading to his resignation. In April 2008, Dann placed Communications Director Leo Jennings on leave, pending the outcome of an ongoing investigation in his office. The investigation focused on allegations of sexual harassment, filed by two women Cindy Stankoski and Vanessa Stout, who worked in Dann’s office under the supervision of Anthony Gutierrez. Jennings and Gutierrez were non-attorney friends of Dann from Youngstown; the three shared a condominium in Columbus.

Jennings joined Gutierrez, Dann’s director of general services, on paid leave pending the outcome of the investigation. The female employees alleged Gutierrez, who was paid $87,500 a year, repeatedly sexually harassed them. A statement from Dann released to reporters gave no details on what led to Jennings being included in the investigation. It said only: "This action comes as a result of new information received over the weekend related to the ongoing investigation into charges of sexual harassment." Dann agreed to conditionally release emails between himself and his former scheduler, Jessica Utovich. Utovich, 28, began as Dann's scheduler, but was transferred to the position of director of travel in late 2007. Upon being transferred, Utovich received a 27% pay raise.

Extramarital affair
On May 2, 2008, following the firing and resignation of a number of his aides in a sexual harassment scandal, Dann admitted he had an extramarital affair with an unidentified subordinate in his office.  However, he initially refused to resign saying his admission and punishment were enough. In the wake of these admissions a number of Ohio papers called for Dann to resign and the Tribune Chronicle even apologized to its readers for their endorsement of Dann during the 2006 election.

On May 4, 2008, the three largest Ohio newspapers ran editorials condemning Dann.  The Plain Dealer (Cleveland, Ohio) opined "Dann has turned the attorney general's office into a laughingstock" and "it's impossible to see how he can recover" The Columbus Dispatch said Dann was "not fit to serve", and the Cincinnati Enquirer called for Dann's resignation.

The Plain Dealer had previously reported that Republicans said that if Dann doesn't step down, they could try to impeach him. On the evening of May 5, Democratic Governor Strickland issued a statement which appeared to support Dann's impeachment should he decide not to resign. Dann showed no interest in departure, even after Strickland's statement.

On May 5, 2008, the Columbus Dispatch reported that seven separate investigations were either underway or being considered responsive to misconduct at the Attorney General's office. On May 10, 2008, the Ohio Democratic Party  voted to remove their endorsement of Dann, remove him of his membership in the Ohio Democratic Party Executive Committee, and called for his immediate resignation as attorney general. On May 12, 2008, articles of impeachment were filed with 42 of the 45 Democrats in the state house supporting the nine counts. At a May 14, 2008, press conference in Columbus, Dann resigned the Office of Attorney General of Ohio.

In March 2009, Dann and his campaign were each fined $1000 by the Ohio Elections Commission for violating campaign-finance laws by using his political account for personal cell phones for his family and for security renovations to his Youngstown-area home. In June 2009, Dann reached a plea agreement with the inspector general of the Elections Commission, Thomas P. Charles, to plead guilty to a single violation of misuse of campaign funds, which he used for travel expenses for family members to San Francisco for a vacation that was to be packaged with a political fundraiser, and pay another fine of $1000 which the Commission agreed to accept in a 5 to 1 vote.

Charles filed complaints against Dann with the Elections Commission on accusations of illegally using his political account to pay Leo Jennings who used the money to pay for rent and utilities for the condominium they shared with Anthony Gutierrez. Gutierrez is scheduled to go on trial in August regarding different allegations relating to his tenure in Dann's office.

Personal
Dann's former spouse, Alyssa Lenhoff, is director of the journalism program at Youngstown State University. Lenhoff won several awards for investigative reporting at the Tribune Chronicle in Warren, Ohio. Lenhoff's former partner at the Tribune, Ed Simpson, was Dann's chief of staff until he resigned under fire on May 2, 2008.
Dann was a Sigma Chi at the University of Michigan. Dann and Lenhoff have three children. Lenhoff filed for divorce from Dann on April 15, 2010, after Dann was caught having an extramarital affair. Their divorce was finalized in July 2010.

Dann was suspended from the practice of law by the Ohio Supreme Court effective November 20, 2012, and was reinstated effective June 11, 2013. Dann now has a private legal practice in Cleveland, Ohio, reportedly specializing in combating home foreclosures.

References 

1962 births
21st-century American Jews
21st-century American politicians
Jewish American state legislators in Ohio
Lawyers from Youngstown, Ohio
Living people
Ohio Attorneys General
Democratic Party Ohio state senators
Politicians from Shaker Heights, Ohio
Politicians from Youngstown, Ohio
School board members in Ohio
University of Michigan alumni